Mary Arlene Appelhof (1936–2005) was an American biologist, vermicomposter, and environmentalist. Her 1982 book Worms Eat My Garbage is still held as seminal reading in the field of vermicomposting. In 2009 she was designated a Women's History Month Honoree by the National Women's History Project.

Family and education 
Mary A. Appelhof was born in Detroit, Michigan on June 11, 1936, being the daughter of Gilbert G. Appelhof Jr. and Hilda Whiteley Appelhof. Her father was Pastor of St. John Episcopal Church in Alma, Ohio and St. Thomas Episcopal Church in Berea, Ohio.  In 1954 she graduated from Berea High School in Berea, Ohio and in 1958 graduated from Michigan State University in East Lansing, Michigan with a B.S. in biology. In 1959 Appelhof graduated from Michigan State University with an M.S. degree in biology.  She later earned an M.S. degree in education and studied advanced biology, an experience totalling five years of study.

Appelhof had many talents, including expert swimming and award-winning nature photography. She taught science at Kalamazoo Central High School in Kalamazoo, Michigan and taught at Interlochen Arts Academy in Interlochen, Michigan.

Designing and promoting worm systems 
In the early 1970s Mary Appelhof began experimenting with worms and organic waste.  Her home worm container would become  a new career.

Her vision at the time of the Stockholm Conference for the Human Environment (1972) was "tons of worms could be eating tons of garbage."
  
Soon she was publicly advocating using the earthworm to recycle food waste.  
As "Worm Woman," she introduced thousands of schoolchildren and home gardeners to vermicomposting.
She was awarded a National Science Foundation grant to do videomicroscopy of live worms. This resulted in a DVD "Wormania."

Flower Press 
Mary Appelhof purchased  an old mimeograph machine from the Democratic Party in the early 1970s.  She used it  to produce  a brochure,  "Basement Worm Bins Produce Potting Soil and Reduce Garbage."  By 1976  her publishing interests  were firm, and she founded Flower Press.   She later explained  her thoughts on self-publishing her bestseller,  Worms Eat My Garbage.

My goal, however, was not to make lots of money, but to influence people's thinking. To get them to think differently about waste, and give them tools to deal with it. Self-publishing my book was the way I could do that. So I learned what I had to learn to be able to do so.

Works
 Worms Eat My Garbage: How to Set Up and Maintain a Worm Composting System. Flower Press 1982, 
Worms Eat Our Garbage: Classroom Activities for a Better Environment. Flower Press 1993, 
 Wormania [DVD].  Flowerfield Enterprises. Available from wormwoman.com

Legacy
Wormania was featured on Red Letter Media's Best of the Worst: Wheel of the Worst #14, where the panel offered extensive commentary on the video, remarking on the production value, the music, and Mary Appelhof's positive attitude and happy demeanor, in addition to her clear passion for worms.

References

External links
Worm Woman website

American women educators
1936 births
2005 deaths
American women environmentalists
American environmentalists
American women biologists
Schoolteachers from Michigan
Scientists from Detroit
Michigan State University alumni
20th-century American women scientists
20th-century American biologists
21st-century American women